Adonis Durado is a Filipino poet, visual journalist, and graphic designer of Cebuano descent. He was born on August 25, 1975, in Cebu City, Philippines. He is a fine arts graduate from the University of San Carlos. In 2017, he received the Knight Fellowship from the School of Visual Communication at Ohio University. He is currently an Assistant Professor at the School of Visual Communication within Ohio University's Scripp's College of Communication.

Literature
Durado has published four books of Cebuano poems. His recent collection To Whom It May Not Concern  (Pahinungod sa Di Hintungdan) was a finalist of the 2019 International Book Awards. 

According to National Artist for Literature Resil Mojares:

Works

Awards 
 2000: Lacaba Prize for Cebuano Poetry 
 2002: Faigao Prize (University of San Carlos - Cebuano Studies Center)
 2012: Writer of the Year (Bathalad Inc.) 
 2017: VisCom Knight Fellowship (Ohio University)
 2017: NCCA Writers' Prize 
 2019: Grand Prize, 39th Cebu Popular Music Festival for "Hugot Pas Huot" (Lyricist)
 2019: International Book Award Finalist for To Whom It May Not Concern
 2019: Second Prize, 1st Visayan Music Awards for "Balitaw" (Lyricist)
 2019: Vicente Ranudo Literary Excellence Award 
 2022: 1st Prize, Bienvenido Lumbera Prize for Cebuano Poetry

Design
As designer, illustrator, and art director, Durado's work has won international honors from the Society for News Design, the Society of Publication Designers, the Society of Illustrators, the Type Director's Club, the Malofiej Infographics Awards, Communication Arts Magazine, Creative Quarterly Journal, and HOW Design Magazine.

Durado helped launch and redesign more than a dozen magazine and newspaper titles in Europe, the Middle East, Africa, and Asia, and had served as a speaker to design conferences in the United States, Turkey, Ukraine, UAE, India, Indonesia, Bangladesh, and the Philippines. 

His works are featured and cited in the books and periodicals, including The Newspaper Designer's Handbook (7th Edition / McGraw-Hill), All About Mags (Sendpoints Publishing), Creative Anarchy: How to Break the Rules of Graphic Design for Creative Success (How Books).

Notes

Living people
1975 births
People from Cebu City
University of San Carlos alumni
21st-century Filipino poets
Filipino illustrators
Artists from Cebu
Writers from Cebu
Filipino male poets
21st-century male writers